Elizabeth Township, Ohio may refer to one of the following places in Ohio:

Elizabeth Township, Lawrence County, Ohio
Elizabeth Township, Miami County, Ohio

See also
Elizabeth Township (disambiguation)

Ohio township disambiguation pages